Toshio Lake (born 26 March 2001) is a Dutch professional footballer who plays as a forward for TOP Oss.

Early and personal life
Born in Rotterdam, Lake is of Sint Maartenese descent. His mother lives in the Netherlands whilst his father lives in Sint Maarten.

Club career
Lake played youth football for SBV Excelsior before joining Feyenoord in 2010. He signed for Fortuna Sittard in summer 2021, initially joining their under-21 side. He made his senior debut on 14 August 2021 as a substitute against FC Twente and scored and provided an assist in a 2–1 win.

On 31 January 2022, Lake was loaned to MVV Maastricht for the rest of the season.

On 11 August 2022, Lake moved to TOP Oss.

International career
Lake made 7 appearances for the Netherlands national under-17 team, and scored once. He made one appearance as the Netherlands won the 2018 UEFA European Under-17 Championship.

Honours
Netherlands U17
 UEFA European Under-17 Championship: 2018

References

External links

2001 births
Living people
Footballers from Rotterdam
Dutch footballers
Netherlands youth international footballers
Dutch people of Sint Maarten descent
Association football forwards
Excelsior Rotterdam players
Feyenoord players
Fortuna Sittard players
MVV Maastricht players
TOP Oss players
Eredivisie players
Eerste Divisie players